Sadrabad (also Romanized as Şadrābād) is a village in Bahreman Rural District, Nuq District, Rafsanjan County, Kerman Province, Iran. At the 2006 census, its population was 24, in 6 families.

References 

Populated places in Rafsanjan County